Richard Manuel (born 1 October 1888, date of death unknown) was an Austrian water polo player. He competed in the men's tournament at the 1912 Summer Olympics.

References

External links
 

1888 births
Year of death missing
Austrian male water polo players
Olympic water polo players of Austria
Water polo players at the 1912 Summer Olympics
People from Břeclav District
Sportspeople from the South Moravian Region